Crepidochares colombiae is a moth in the Eriocottidae family. It was described by Davis in 1990. It is found in Colombia.

Etymology
The species is named for Colombia, the country of origin.

References

Moths described in 1990
Eriocottidae
Moths of South America